Politics in the San Francisco Bay Area is widely regarded as one of the most liberal in the country. According to the California Secretary of State, the Democratic Party holds a voter registration advantage in every congressional district, State Senate district, State Assembly district, State Board of Equalization district, all nine counties, and all of the 101 incorporated municipalities in the Bay Area. The Republican Party holds a voter registration advantage in one State Assembly sub-district (the portion of the 4th in Solano County). 

Since 1960, the nine-county Bay Area has voted for Republican presidential candidates only twice: in 1972 for Richard Nixon and in 1980 for Ronald Reagan, both Californians. The last county to vote for a Republican presidential candidate was Napa County in 1988 for George H. W. Bush.

County-level statistics
All nine counties in the Bay Area currently have a voter registration advantage in favor of the Democratic Party.

Congressional districts
Every Congressional district in the Bay Area is currently represented by a Democrat. According to the Cook Partisan Voting Index (CPVI), congressional districts the Bay Area tends to favor Democratic candidates by roughly 40 to 50 percentage points, considerably above the mean for California and the nation overall. All congressional districts in the region voted for Democrat Barack Obama over Republican John McCain in the 2008 Presidential Election.

During the Base Realignment and Closures (BRACs) of the 1990s, almost all the military installations in the region were closed. The only remaining major active duty military installations are Travis Air Force Base and Coast Guard Island.

References